This is a list of French television related events from 1955.

Events

Debuts
2 October -   Présence protestante
16 October - La Boîte à sel (1955-1960)

Television shows

1940s
Le Jour du Seigneur (1949-present)

1950s
Face à l'opinion
Le Club du jeudi (1950-1961)
Magazine féminin (1952-1970)
Lectures pour tous (1953-1968)

Ending this year

Births
19 July - Karen Cheryl, singer, actress & TV & radio presenter

Deaths

See also
1955 in France
List of French films of 1955